International Business College is a for-profit college located in Fort Wayne, Indiana. The institution was founded in 1889 and is now located in the Village at Coventry. IBC awards diplomas and associate degrees.

Student body, admissions, and outcomes
According to Peterson's and recent institutional publications, International Business College has an undergraduate population of 438. Of 747 applicants, 556 were admitted. According to College Navigator, for the most recent year, the graduation/retention rate was 73%.

Academics
International Business College provides career-focused courses to high school graduates.  Some programs are offered in both daytime or evening classes. IBC groups its twelve major areas of study into three main categories: Business, Technology, and Health Care.

Accreditation
International Business College is accredited by the Accrediting Council for Independent Colleges and Schools  to award diplomas, associate degrees, and bachelor's degrees.
The Medical Assisting Program is accredited by the Commission on Accreditation of Allied Health Education Programs (CAAHEP)
The Veterinary Technician program is accredited by the American Veterinary Medical Association (AVMA) Committee on Veterinary Technician Education and Activities (CVTEA).

References

External links
Official website

Graphic design schools in the United States
For-profit universities and colleges in the United States
Education in Fort Wayne, Indiana
1889 establishments in Indiana
Educational institutions established in 1889